Spheniopsidae is a family of bivalves belonging to the order Myida.

Genera:
 Grippina Dall, 1912
 Spheniopsis Sandberger, 1861

References

Myida
Bivalve families